Rekaj (also Romanized as Rekāj; also known as Rekāj Kolā) is a village in Lalehabad Rural District, Lalehabad District, Babol County, Mazandaran Province, Iran. At the 2006 census, its population was 53, in 13 families.

References 

Populated places in Babol County